The 2012-13 Scottish League Championship (or 2012-13 RBS Scottish League Championship for sponsorship reasons) was the 39th season of formal domestic rugby union leagues in Scotland. The season was contested between August 2012 and March 2013, with Ayr RFC winning a historic Championship and Cup double.

Participants

National

Scottish Regional Leagues

There are three Regions: West, East and Caledonia. These have been formed over time from the old system of independent District leagues.

West Regional League, 2012-2013

East Regional League, 2012-2013

Caledonia Regional League, 2012-2013

Rugby in Scotland